The following highways are numbered 12B:

United States
 New England Route 12B (former)
 County Road 12B (Gadsden County, Florida)
Missouri Route 12B (former)
 Nebraska Spur 12B
 New York State Route 12B
 County Route 12B (Cayuga County, New York)
 Secondary State Highway 12-B (Washington) (former)